Darlington Township may refer to the following places:

Canada
Darlington Township, Durham County, Ontario (merged into Darlington, Ontario in 1973)

United States
Darlington Township, Harvey County, Kansas
Darlington Township, Canadian County, Oklahoma
Darlington Township, Beaver County, Pennsylvania
Darlington Township, Charles Mix County, South Dakota
Darlington Township, Clark County, South Dakota

See also
Darlington (disambiguation)
Darling Township (disambiguation)

Township name disambiguation pages